In mathematics, especially order theory, a partial order on a set is an arrangement such that, for certain pairs of elements, one precedes the other. The word partial is used to indicate that not every pair of elements needs to be comparable; that is, there may be pairs for which neither element precedes the other. Partial orders thus generalize total orders, in which every pair is comparable. Formally, a partial order is a homogeneous binary relation that is reflexive, transitive and antisymmetric. A partially ordered set (poset for short) is a set on which a partial order is defined.

Partial order relations 
The term partial order usually refers to the reflexive partial order relations, referred to in this article as non-strict partial orders. However some authors use the term for the other common type of partial order relations, the irreflexive partial order relations, also called strict partial orders. Strict and non-strict partial orders can be put into a one-to-one correspondence, so for every strict partial order there is a unique corresponding non-strict partial order, and vice versa.

Partial orders 

That is, for all  it must satisfy:

 Reflexivity: , i.e. every element is related to itself.
 Antisymmetry: if  and  then , i.e. no two distinct elements precede each other.
 Transitivity: if  and  then .

A non-strict partial order is also known as an antisymmetric preorder.

Strict partial orders 

Irreflexivity: not , i.e. no element is related to itself (also called anti-reflexive).
Asymmetry: if  then not .
Transitivity: if  and  then .

Irreflexivity and transitivity together imply asymmetry. Also, asymmetry implies irreflexivity. In other words, a transitive relation is asymmetric if and only if it is irreflexive. So the definition is the same if it omits either irreflexivity or asymmetry (but not both).

A strict partial order is also known as an asymmetric strict preorder.

Correspondence of strict and non-strict partial order relations 

Strict and non-strict partial orders on a set  are closely related. Conversely, a strict partial order < on  may be converted to a non-strict partial order by adjoining all relationships of that form; that is,  is a non-strict partial order. Thus, if  is a non-strict partial order, then the corresponding strict partial order < is the irreflexive kernel given by

Conversely, if < is a strict partial order, then the corresponding non-strict partial order  is the reflexive closure given by:

Dual orders 

The dual of a non-strict partial order is a non-strict partial order, and the dual of a strict partial order is a strict partial order. The dual of a dual of a relation is the original relation.

Notation 

Strictly speaking, the term partially ordered set refers to a set with all of these relations defined appropriately.

The term ordered set is sometimes used as a shorthand for partially ordered set, as long as it is clear from the context that no other kind of order is meant. In particular, totally ordered sets can also be referred to as "ordered sets", especially in areas where these structures are more common than posets.

Alternative definitions 

Another way of defining a partial order, found in computer science, is via a notion of comparison. Specifically, given  as defined previously, it can be observed that two elements x and y may stand in any of four mutually exclusive relationships to each other: either x < y, or x = y, or x > y, or x and y are incomparable. This can be represented by a function  that returns one of four codes when given two elements.

Wallis defines a more general notion of a partial order relation as any homogeneous relation that is transitive and antisymmetric. This includes both reflexive and irreflexive partial orders as subtypes.

A finite poset can be visualized through its Hasse diagram. The transitive reduction of this DAG is then the Hasse diagram. Similarly this process can be reversed to construct strict partial orders from certain DAGs. In contrast, the graph associated to a non-strict partial order has self-loops at every node and therefore is not a DAG; when a non-strict order is said to be depicted by a Hasse diagram, actually the corresponding strict order is shown.

Examples 

Standard examples of posets arising in mathematics include:

 The real numbers, or in general any totally ordered set, ordered by the standard less-than-or-equal relation ≤, is a partial order.
 On the real numbers , the usual less than relation < is a strict partial order.
 By definition, every strict weak order is a strict partial order.
 The set of subsets of a given set (its power set) ordered by inclusion (see Fig.1). Similarly, the set of sequences ordered by subsequence, and the set of strings ordered by substring.
 The set of natural numbers equipped with the relation of divisibility. (see Fig.3 and Fig.6)
 The vertex set of a directed acyclic graph ordered by reachability.
 The set of subspaces of a vector space ordered by inclusion.
 For a partially ordered set P, the sequence space containing all sequences of elements from P, where sequence a precedes sequence b if every item in a precedes the corresponding item in b. Formally,  if and only if  for all ; that is, a componentwise order.
 For a set X and a partially ordered set P, the function space containing all functions from X to P, where f ≤ g if and only if f(x) ≤ g(x) for all 
 A fence, a partially ordered set defined by an alternating sequence of order relations a < b > c < d ...
 The set of events in special relativity and, in most cases, general relativity, where for two events X and Y, X ≤ Y if and only if Y is in the future light cone of X. An event Y can only be causally affected by X if X ≤ Y.

One familiar example of a partially ordered set is a collection of people ordered by genealogical descendancy. Some pairs of people bear the descendant-ancestor relationship, but other pairs of people are incomparable, with neither being a descendant of the other.

Orders on the Cartesian product of partially ordered sets

In order of increasing strength, i.e., decreasing sets of pairs, three of the possible partial orders on the Cartesian product of two partially ordered sets are (see Fig.4):
the lexicographical order:   (a, b) ≤ (c, d) if a < c or (a = c and b ≤ d);
the product order:    (a, b) ≤ (c, d) if a ≤ c and b ≤ d;
the reflexive closure of the direct product of the corresponding strict orders:    (a, b) ≤ (c, d) if (a < c and b < d) or (a = c and b = d).

All three can similarly be defined for the Cartesian product of more than two sets.

Applied to ordered vector spaces over the same field, the result is in each case also an ordered vector space.

See also orders on the Cartesian product of totally ordered sets.

Sums of partially ordered sets 

Another way to combine two (disjoint) posets is the ordinal sum (or linear sum), Z = X ⊕ Y, defined on the union of the underlying sets X and Y by the order a ≤Z b if and only if:
 a, b ∈ X with a ≤X b, or
 a, b ∈ Y with a ≤Y b, or
 a ∈ X and b ∈ Y.

If two posets are well-ordered, then so is their ordinal sum.

Series-parallel partial orders are formed from the ordinal sum operation (in this context called series composition) and another operation called parallel composition. Parallel composition is the disjoint union of two partially ordered sets, with no order relation between elements of one set and elements of the other set.

Derived notions 

The examples use the poset  consisting of the set of all subsets of a three-element set  ordered by set inclusion (see Fig.1).

 a is related to b when a ≤ b. This does not imply that b is also related to a, because the relation need not be symmetric. For example,  is related to  but not the reverse.
 a and b are comparable if a ≤ b or b ≤ a. Otherwise they are incomparable.
 A total order or linear order is a partial order under which every pair of elements is comparable, i.e. trichotomy holds. For example, the natural numbers with their standard order.
 A chain is a subset of a poset that is a totally ordered set. For example,  is a chain.
 An antichain is a subset of a poset in which no two distinct elements are comparable. For example, the set of singletons 
 An element a is said to be strictly less than an element b, if a ≤ b and  For example,  is strictly less than 
For example,  is covered by  but is not covered by

Extrema 

There are several notions of "greatest" and "least" element in a poset  notably:
 Greatest element and least element: An element  is a  if for every element  An element  is a  if for every element  A poset can only have one greatest or least element.
 Maximal elements and minimal elements: An element  is a maximal element if there is no element  such that  Similarly, an element  is a minimal element if there is no element  such that  If a poset has a greatest element, it must be the unique maximal element, but otherwise there can be more than one maximal element, and similarly for least elements and minimal elements. Removing these, there are 3 maximal elements and 3 minimal elements (see Fig.5).

As another example, consider the positive integers, ordered by divisibility: 1 is a least element, as it divides all other elements; on the other hand this poset does not have a greatest element (although if one would include 0 in the poset, which is a multiple of any integer, that would be a greatest element; see Fig.6). This partially ordered set does not even have any maximal elements, since any g divides for instance 2g, which is distinct from it, so g is not maximal. If the number 1 is excluded, while keeping divisibility as ordering on the elements greater than 1, then the resulting poset does not have a least element, but any prime number is a minimal element for it. In this poset, 60 is an upper bound (though not a least upper bound) of the subset  which does not have any lower bound (since 1 is not in the poset); on the other hand 2 is a lower bound of the subset of powers of 2, which does not have any upper bound.

Mappings between partially ordered sets

Given two partially ordered sets (S, ≤) and (T, ≼), a function  is called order-preserving, or monotone, or isotone, if for all   implies f(x) ≼ f(y).
A function  is called order-reflecting if for all  f(x) ≼ f(y) implies 
If  is both order-preserving and order-reflecting, then it is called an order-embedding of (S, ≤) into (T, ≼).
In the latter case,  is necessarily injective, since  implies  and in turn  according to the antisymmetry of  If an order-embedding between two posets S and T exists, one says that S can be embedded into T. If an order-embedding  is bijective, it is called an order isomorphism, and the partial orders (S, ≤) and (T, ≼) are said to be isomorphic. Isomorphic orders have structurally similar Hasse diagrams (see Fig.7a). It can be shown that if order-preserving maps  and  exist such that  and  yields the identity function on S and T, respectively, then S and T are order-isomorphic.

For example, a mapping  from the set of natural numbers (ordered by divisibility) to the power set of natural numbers (ordered by set inclusion) can be defined by taking each number to the set of its prime divisors. Taking instead each number to the set of its prime power divisors defines a map  that is order-preserving, order-reflecting, and hence an order-embedding.

Number of partial orders
Sequence [ A001035] in OEIS gives the number of partial orders on a set of n labeled elements:

The number of strict partial orders is the same as that of partial orders.

If the count is made only up to isomorphism, the sequence 1, 1, 2, 5, 16, 63, 318, ...  is obtained.

Linear extension 

A partial order  on a set  is an extension of another partial order  on  provided that for all elements  whenever  it is also the case that  A linear extension is an extension that is also a linear (that is, total) order. As a classic example, the lexicographic order of totally ordered sets is a linear extension of their product order. Every partial order can be extended to a total order (order-extension principle).

In computer science, algorithms for finding linear extensions of partial orders (represented as the reachability orders of directed acyclic graphs) are called topological sorting.

In category theory 

In differential topology, homology theory HT is used for classifying equivalent smooth manifolds M, related to the geometrical shapes of M.  

Posets are equivalent to one another if and only if they are isomorphic. In a poset, the smallest element, if it exists, is an initial object, and the largest element, if it exists, is a terminal object. Also, every preordered set is equivalent to a poset. Finally, every subcategory of a poset is isomorphism-closed.In differential topology, homology theory HT is used for classifying equivalent smooth manifolds M, related to the geometrical shapes of M.  In homology theory is given an axiomatic HT approach, especially to singular homology. The HT members are algebraic invariants under diffeomorphisms. The axiomatic HT category is taken in G. Kalmbach from the book Eilenberg-Steenrod (see the references) in order to show that the set theoretical topological concept for the HT definition can be extended to partial ordered sets P. Important are chains and filters in P (replacing shapes of M) for defining HT classifications, available for many P applications not related to set theory.

Partial orders in topological spaces

Intervals

(This definition generalizes the interval definition for real numbers.)

For a ≤ b, the closed interval  is the set of elements x satisfying a ≤ x ≤ b (that is, a ≤ x and x ≤ b). It contains at least the elements a and b.

Using the corresponding strict relation "<", the open interval  is the set of elements x satisfying a < x < b (i.e. a < x and x < b). An open interval may be empty even if a < b.  For example, the open interval  on the integers is empty since there are no integers  such that .

Sometimes the definitions are extended to allow a > b, in which case the interval is empty.

An interval  is bounded if there exist elements  such that . Every interval that can be represented in interval notation is obviously bounded, but the converse is not true. For example, let  as a subposet of the real numbers. The subset  is a bounded interval, but it has no infimum or supremum in P, so it cannot be written in interval notation using elements of P.

A poset is called locally finite if every bounded interval is finite. For example, the integers are locally finite under their natural ordering. The lexicographical order on the cartesian product  is not locally finite, since .
Using the interval notation, the property "a is covered by b" can be rephrased equivalently as 

This concept of an interval in a partial order should not be confused with the particular class of partial orders known as the interval orders.

See also 

 Antimatroid, a formalization of orderings on a set that allows more general families of orderings than posets
 Causal set, a poset-based approach to quantum gravity
 
 
 
 
 
 
 
 
 Nested Set Collection
 
 
 
 
 Poset topology, a kind of topological space that can be defined from any poset
 Scott continuity – continuity of a function between two partial orders.
 
 
 Szpilrajn extension theorem - every partial order is contained in some total order.
 
 Strict weak ordering – strict partial order "<" in which the relation   is transitive.
 
 Tree – Data structure of set inclusion

Notes

Citations

References

External links

 
 

Order theory
Binary relations

de:Ordnungsrelation#Halbordnung